New Castle is a city in and the county seat of Lawrence County, Pennsylvania, United States. As of the 2020 U.S. census, the city had a population of 21,926. 

New Castle is the commercial center of a fertile agricultural region,
officially the New Castle micropolitan area, which had a population of 86,070 in 2020. The city also anchors the northwestern part of the Pittsburgh–New Castle–Weirton combined statistical area.

History

18th century
In 1798, John Carlysle Stewart, a civil engineer, traveled to western Pennsylvania to resurvey the "donation lands", which had been reserved for veterans of the Revolutionary War. The Indian town of Kuskusky was listed on early maps in this location. Claiming the land for himself, he laid out in April 1798 what was to become the town of New Castle. It comprised approximately that same , in what was then part of Allegheny County.

19th century
In 1825, New Castle became a borough, having a population of about 300. The city later became a part of Mercer County. On April 5, 1849, the governor of Pennsylvania signed an act creating Lawrence County, named in honor of U.S. Navy Captain James Lawrence. New Castle became a city in 1869 and was headed by its first mayor, Thomas B. Morgan. At that time, the population had increased to about 6,000.

In 1849, a group of Old Order Amish families from Mifflin County, Pennsylvania, settled just north of New Castle in New Wilmington. Later migrations from Holmes County, Ohio, would make this Amish community one of the largest in Pennsylvania. Approximately 2,000 Amish live and work presently in the townships north of New Castle.

Business in New Castle began to flourish in the early 19th century with the construction of the Beaver and Erie Canal system, which made its way through the city. Numerous manufacturing plants became located in New Castle because of the availability of transportation facilities and ready access to raw material markets. The canal system was later supplemented and then replaced by railroads which offered greater speed and capacity for freight, as well as year-round service.

In the 1870s, the city became a major hub of the Pittsburgh and Lake Erie Railroad. New Castle's population swelled from 11,600 in 1890 to 28,339 in 1900, and to 38,280 in 1910, as immigrants, particularly from Italy, flocked to the city to work in the mills and nearby limestone quarries. Italian laborers of the era were frequent victims of the Black Hand society, which employed blackmail and extortion to rob the workers of their pay. In 1907 the headquarters of the Black Hand for the entire region was discovered in the village of Hillsville a few miles west of New Castle. By this time New Castle was one of the fastest-growing cities in the country, and with the construction of the largest tin plate mill in America, the city became the tin plate capital of the world. The tin plate industry marked a new increase in the city's prosperity.

20th century
In 1908, New Castle was linked to Pittsburgh by the Pittsburgh, Harmony, Butler and New Castle Railway, an interurban trolley line. Steel and paper mills, foundries, a bronze bushing factory, and car-construction plants contributed to the region's economy. Shenango China produced commercial china and created the fine Castleton China line for the White House, including dinnerware for Presidents Dwight D. Eisenhower and Lyndon B. Johnson. Other ceramic factories produced bathroom fixtures and industrial refractory materials.

In the 1920s, New Castle enjoyed its greatest prosperity. The landscape of the city was transformed with the building of many beautiful structures, some of which still stand, such as the Scottish Rite Cathedral, St. Mary's Church, and the Castleton Hotel. The city also established its identity. New Castle is known both as the "hot dog capital of the world" and the "fireworks capital of America". Its chili dogs are the product of Greek immigrants who came to New Castle in the early 20th century and established restaurants along with their homes. The renown for fireworks is credited to two local fireworks companies of international stature, S.Vitale Pyrotechnic Industries, Inc. (Pyrotecnico) and Zambelli Internationale. The first fireworks manufacturer in New Castle was Leopold Fazzoni, who owned and operated the Fazzoni Brothers Fireworks Company. Fazzoni came to New Castle from Italy in 1886 and worked in the tin mills to earn enough money to start his own business. He was issued the first certificate for fireworks manufacturing in the state. Of the people who worked with the Fazzoni family, many founded their own businesses, such as Paul Rozzi, Jacob Conti, Constantino Vitale, and Joseph Zambelli.

Despite recent economic challenges, the city continues to serve as the headquarters of Pyrotecnico Fireworks, the winner of the 2008 Gold Jupiter, awarded at the world's most prestigious fireworks venue: LaRonde in Montreal, Canada. The company was started by Constantino Vitale in Italy in 1889, who immigrated to New Castle in the 1920s, continuing his business there. Five generations of the Vitale family have transformed the company. In the 1990s the company's name was changed to Pyrotecnico and has grown to be a world leader in the industry. Also located in New Castle is Zambelli Fireworks, which was founded in New Castle. Zambelli Fireworks is one of the world's leading fireworks and pyrotechnics companies. These fireworks companies have been featured in venues such as presidential celebrations and Super Bowls. Pyrotecnico and Zambelli Fireworks have changed the face of the fireworks industry. This has gained the city the nickname of "Fireworks Capital of America". New Castle has recently opened Zambelli Plaza near the Cascade Center in 2007 in honor of the Zambelli family's accomplishments.

In the 1930s, the city, along with most cities of America, suffered during the Great Depression. During this time, the federal government established the Works Progress Administration (WPA) and the Civilian Conservation Corps (CCC). These programs offered jobs to many displaced workers. Many of the stone walls built by the WPA and the CCC still stand as a reminder of the historic demise of the economy. In the 1940s, industry temporarily surged during wartime.

In 1950, the population peaked at 48,834, but became part of the Rust Belt, with population dwindling to 28,334 by 1990. New Castle is the county seat of Lawrence County which has a population of approximately 91,000.

In 1998, New Castle was a host city for the History Channel Great Race. Over 15,000 spectators gathered downtown for the festivities. The city celebrated its 200th birthday in 1998 with a downtown fireworks festival that attracted over 30,000 people.

The Lawrence County Courthouse, North Hill Historic District, and Scottish Rite Cathedral are listed on the National Register of Historic Places.

Geography
New Castle is located in the center of Lawrence County at  (40.997325, −80.344556), along the Shenango River at the mouth of Neshannock Creek.

Via the Shenango River, the city is part of the Beaver River watershed, flowing south to the Ohio River.

Surrounding and adjacent neighborhoods
New Castle has six land borders with townships: Neshannock Township to the north, Hickory Township to the northeast, Shenango Township to the southeast, Taylor Township to the south-southwest, North Beaver Township to the southwest, and Union Township to the west. Also to the south is the border with South New Castle.

Demographics

As of the 2010 census, there were 23,273 people, 9,765 households, and 5,793 families residing in the city. The population density was 2,725.2 people per square mile. There were 11,304 housing units at an average density of 1,323.7 per square mile. 1,539 housing units were vacant. The racial makeup of the city was 83.2% White, 12.2% African American, 0.1% Native American, 0.4% Asian, 0.1% Pacific Islander, 0.4% from other races, and 3.7% from two or more races. Hispanic or Latino of any race were 1.6% of the population.

There were 9,765 households, out of which 24.5% had children under the age of 18 living with them, 34.8% were married couples living together, 18.6% had a female householder with no husband present, and 40.7% were non-families. 28.4% of all households contained individuals under 18, and 15.9% had someone living alone who was 65 years of age or older. The average household size was 2.3 and the average family size was 2.98.

In the city, the population was spread out, with 25.1% under the age of 20, 5.9% from 20 to 24, 24.0% from 25 to 44, 26.7% from 45 to 64, and 18.3% who were 65 years of age or older. The median age was 40.8 years old. For every 100 females, there were 85.3 males.

As of 2017 American Community Survey estimates, the median income for a household in the city was $31,044, and the median income for a family was $42,807. The per capita income for the city was $13,730. About 23.3% of families and 27.2% of the population were below the poverty line, including 40.8% of those under age 18 and 15.4% of those age 65 or over.

Economy

Downtown New Castle underwent a redevelopment centered around the Cascade Center. The downtown streets and sidewalks were rebuilt in the early 21st century in earlier styles. The revitalization of downtown also saw two major routes into the city, Pennsylvania Route 65 and U.S. Route 224, which had both had their termini extended into downtown in 2007.

InfoCision, a telemarketing services company, restored the former New Castle Dry Goods Co. building, into which it relocated its offices from their former location inside  Cascade Galleria. The building had been vacant since the late 1980s when the Troutman's department store closed. The building is now known as the Pier I Complex Building.

The downtown area has also become the home of several bank offices, hosting the regional headquarters of Huntington and First Commonwealth (all descended from banks formerly based in the city but later acquired) as well as branches for PNC Bank and First National Bank. FirstMerit also had its regional headquarters in New Castle prior to their acquisition by Huntington, and that building is expected to be town down in 2020. Mellon Bank also had offices across the street from the current Zambelli Plaza before selling off its New Castle-area branches to First National Bank, which closed the office building since it already had the aforementioned branch in downtown.

As of 2018, New Castle employed 8,677 people. Industries employing the most were healthcare, social assistance, utilities, transportation and warehouses. Healthcare and social assistance employed 1,724 people, followed by retail trade with 1,172 employees and then manufacturing employing 1,012 employees. The highest paying occupations in this area are utility positions, having a median income of $72,917; professional scientific and technical services, with a median income of $45,125; and educational services, with a median income of $40,469. The current poverty rate in this city is 27.4%, with a median household income of $31,557. The 2017 unemployment rate was 8.1%, greater than the U.S. average of 5.2%. Over the past 40 years, New Castle has been transformed from an industrial economy to a more balanced economy based on manufacturing, retail, and service-related businesses. Many buildings and old homes were being renovated by incoming residents.

Taxes
The current U.S. average sales tax rate was 6.0%, the same as New Castle's sales tax rate at 6.0%. The U.S. average income tax rate was 4.6%, slightly less than New Castle's 5.2%.

Income
Per year, the average income of a New Castle resident was $18,463 and the U.S. average income per resident was $28,555 per year.  The median household income for a New Castle resident was $29,762. This came up short of the U.S. average at $53,482 a year. The current poverty rate in New Castle was 27.4%, much higher than the average for Pennsylvania at 13.3%.

White workers made 1.66 times the amount of salary that African American workers made. African Americans make the second highest salary of any race or ethnicity in New Castle.

Arts and culture

The city was the site of an important development in the history of the Warner Bros. empire, given that the first Warner Brothers' theatre, the Cascade, opened here in 1907. The building was nearly condemned in 1996 after a wall fell on the sidewalk. Warner Bros. donated $150,000, which the Pennsylvania government matched, to restore the facade. Municipal officials have planned recent revitalization efforts around the historic site. The Cascade Center currently features two restaurants and a local stage theater, and plans are in progress to turn the complex into New Castle's version of Station Square in Pittsburgh.

The Cascade Center is named after Cascade Park, located on the outskirts of the city's East Side in Shenango Township along Pennsylvania Route 65. A former trolley park, it was restored and converted into a regular outdoor park in the 1980s with a few historical buildings as well as the park's entrance sign restored, avoiding the fate of nearby Idora Park in Youngstown. The park hosts the annual "Back to the 50s Weekend" classic car show, and previously hosted the similarly themed "Thunder in the Cascades" motorcycle show.

The New Castle Playhouse, a community theatre, is located along Long Avenue and puts on several shows a year. It is one of only a few such theatres between Youngstown and Pittsburgh. The Old Princeton School, located nearby, has been the venue for rock concerts.

In the 2011 movie Super 8, New Castle is referenced as the "fireworks capital of the world".

New Castle is the subject of the true crime blog "Small Town Noir", which uses mug shots taken in New Castle between 1930 and 1960, and which were rescued when the town's police department threw them out. The information on the images comes from the New Castle News.

New Castle has a large Arab-American population whose culture is visible throughout the community. Large numbers of Lebanese and Syrian immigrants were attracted by the city's prosperity in the late 19th and early 20th centuries. Their culture is especially visible in the local cuisine, which makes popular use of items such as stuffed grape leaves, lamb on the rod, kibbe, and garlic sauce. Although many other Rust Belt cities contain large Arab-American populations, New Castle is unique for its large population of Alawite Muslims from Syria. The Muslim community of the city has a mosque on the East Side of town.

North Hill Historic District

The district consists of 91 blocks between Falls Street near downtown New Castle to Fairmont Avenue near Neshannock Township. Its buildings include late 19th century, early 20th century, late Victorian, and late 19th and 20th century revival styles. Some of these buildings have been torn down since its addition to the register, with the most notable examples being torn down for the construction of the New Castle High School and the construction of a Speedway gas station.

International relations
The town is part of a worldwide network of towns and cities with the name Newcastle. These include cities in Australia, Canada, Czech Republic, Denmark, Georgia (country), Germany, Indiana, Japan, Latvia, Malaysia, Montenegro, Slovakia, South Africa, Switzerland, and the United Kingdom. Representatives from New Castle have attended the bi-annual Newcastles of the World summit since 1998.

Education

Primary and secondary
The city is served by the New Castle Area School District, which also serves nearby Taylor Township, including West Pittsburg . The Lawrence County Career and Technical Center is located in the city. As of 2017 the school district consisted of Croton Pre-Kindergarten Center, Harry W. Lockley Early Learning Center (K-2), George Washington Intermediate School (3-5), and New Castle Junior/Senior High School (6-12).

New Castle Christian Academy on Albert Street between Sumner Avenue and Clen-Moore Boulevard serves students from Pre-K to 9th grade. St. Vitus Catholic School on South Jefferson Street and Home Street serves students from Pre-K to 8th grade.

Post-secondary
New Castle is primarily served by five post-secondary education facilities: the New Castle Beauty School for cosmetology students in downtown, the New Castle School of Trades for technical trades in Pulaski Township, the Jameson School of Nursing (owned and operated by UPMC Jameson) within the city, and the Lawrence County branch of Butler County Community College, which opened in 2008 in Union Township and serves as a primary community college to Lawrence County.

Media

Newspaper
The city is served by the New Castle News, a newspaper published in the afternoon Monday-Friday. On the weekends, the paper publishes the New Castle News Weekend on Saturday mornings. The Pittsburgh Post-Gazette, Pittsburgh Tribune-Review, and The Vindicator (Youngstown) also have large distributions in the area.

Television
The New Castle area is served by both the Pittsburgh and Youngstown television markets, with regular news coverage in the area from both. Despite being considerably closer to Youngstown, New Castle is part of the Pittsburgh designated market area by Nielsen Media Research. New Castle was home to the first ABC television affiliate in Western Pennsylvania when FCC channel 45 WKST-TV signed on in 1953, as WTAE-TV in Pittsburgh did not sign on until 1958 and WJET-TV did not sign on in Erie until 1966. The station moved its license to Youngstown in 1964, moved to channel 33, and changed its call sign to WYTV. 

NCTV45 is the only YouTube channel that currently operates as an internet-based television station in New Castle.

The WNWW radio and cable television channel at Westminster College in New Wilmington operates channel 183 on Comcast cable, currently the only television broadcast outlet in Lawrence County.

In the 1990s, WBGN-TV low-power TV stations were established between Youngstown and Pittsburgh. Later, Michael Dell bought the station and moved it to Cranberry Township, Pennsylvania. WEPA-CD, a low-power television station (channel 16, virtual 59) licensed to serve, which held the call sign WBGN-LP, WBGN-LD, or WBGN-CD from 1998 to 2014.

Radio
Radio stations, however, are part of the Youngstown radio market according to Arbitron ratings, even though some Pittsburgh-area radio stations can easily be heard within the area. New Castle is home to two commercial AM radio stations: talk radio station WKST 1200 and sports talk station WUZZ AM 1280, the latter being a Fox Sports Radio affiliate. For FM radio, WKPL FM 92.1, first a full-time country music station called WFEM or C92 then rebranded as Classic Gold an oldies station, was licensed in New Castle before its license was moved back to Ellwood City in 2004, though it still includes New Castle as one of its local communities as part of its FCC-mandated station identification. The AM stations are owned by Altoona-based Forever Broadcasting, LLC while classic rock station WKPL 92.1 FM is owned by Froggy parent Keymarket Communications of Pittsburgh.

WLDJ, a not-for-profit community radio station, also broadcasts out of New Castle. NCRadio450 operates as an internet radio station from NCTV45.com, focused on playing music highlighting the original songs of local/regional bands.

Infrastructure

Transportation

New Castle has public transportation in the form of the New Castle Transit Authority, which provides bus service to patrons around the city and makes three daily trips to Pittsburgh.

The city is served by numerous highways, with Pennsylvania Route 18 and U.S. Route 422 being the major routes running through the city, while Interstate 376 passes to the west of the city. Two more major routes — Pennsylvania Route 65 and U.S. Route 224 — terminate in the city. Pennsylvania Route 108 and Pennsylvania Route 168 also run through the city. U.S. 422 Business, a former alignment of U.S. 422, runs through the city, ending on each side of the city when the main 422 leaves the New Castle Bypass. I-376 and U.S. 422 are briefly concurrent with each other on the New Castle Bypass, though south of New Castle until Chippewa Township near Beaver Falls, I-376 is tolled by the Pennsylvania Turnpike Commission.

The closest airport is the New Castle Municipal Airport, with no commercial service. Also, Youngstown-Warren Regional Airport, Akron-Canton Airport, and Cleveland Hopkins International Airport, are all within  of the city center.

Healthcare
New Castle's only hospital is UPMC Jameson, located at the intersection of Wilmington Avenue and Garfield Street.

Medicare reimbursements per enrollee were $11,153 in 2014, but $11,196 in 2013. Medicare reimbursements per enrollee in Lawrence County are $1,565 more than national average.

Notable people

 W. Thomas Andrews, Pennsylvania state senator
 Joseph Baldwin, educator
 Charlie Bennett, Major League Baseball catcher for four teams
 John Blangero, human geneticist; highly cited scientist in the field of complex disease genetics
 Charles Joseph Carter, magician
 George Chip, middleweight boxing champion of the world from 1913 to 1914
 William C. Chip, Major general, USMC, son of George Chip
 Ben Ciccone, NFL player for the Pittsburgh Steelers
 Ralph J. Cicerone, scientist, president of the National Academy of Sciences
 Bruce Clark, professional football player with the New Orleans Saints and Kansas City Chiefs and Penn State All-American
 Jack Cole, cartoonist and creator of the superhero Plastic Man
 Paul Cuba, American football player
 Nick DeCarbo, NFL player
 Matt DeSalvo (born September 11, 1980), Major League Baseball starting pitcher with the Florida Marlins and formerly the New York Yankees and Atlanta Braves
 Darrell Dess (born July 11, 1935), former football player for the Pittsburgh Steelers, the New York Giants, and the Washington Redskins
 Thomas Fee (August 6, 1931 – August 7, 2013), member of the U.S. House of Representatives from New Castle
 Israel Gaither, National Commander of The Salvation Army in the United States, the first black person to serve in that capacity
 Helen Thornton Geer, prominent librarian and academic 
 Louis E. Graham, member of the U.S. House of Representatives from Pennsylvania
 Edmond Hamilton (October 21, 1904 – February 1, 1971), prolific science fiction author writing chiefly in the genre described as space opera
 Gabbie Hanna, YouTuber, singer and author
 Malik Hooker (born 1996), Indianapolis Colts safety, drafted 15th pick in 2017
 Donnie Iris, born in New Castle (February 28, 1943), but grew up in nearby Ellwood City; rock singer and guitarist, best known for his work with the Jaggerz, Wild Cherry and Donnie Iris and the Cruisers.
 Francis Jackson (born 1815 to 1820), born free, he was kidnapped in 1850 and sold into slavery and was finally freed in 1855 with the resolution of Francis Jackson v. John W. Deshazer.
 Oscar Lawrence Jackson, member of the U.S. House of Representatives from Pennsylvania
 John Kiriakou (born August 9, 1964), former CIA operative who in 2007 was the first to admit that the agency used waterboarding as a form of interrogation
 Charles McMeen Kurtz (1855-1909), art critic, writer, museum curator
 Donald N. Levine (1931–2015), sociologist, educator, social theorist and writer
 Mark Mangino (August 26, 1956), former head coach of the University of Kansas football team
 Mike Marshall, musician
 Scott McCurley, NFL assistant coach with the Green Bay Packers
 Bill McPeak, football player and National Football League coach
 Andrew R. Morgan, US astronaut, selected in 2013
 Lance Nimmo, NFL player with Tampa Bay Buccaneers, New York Jets, Cleveland Browns, New England Patriots
 Thomas Wharton Phillips, member of the U.S. House of Representatives from Pennsylvania
 Rick Razzano, professional football player
 Trent Reznor, lead singer for industrial rock band Nine Inch Nails
 Christopher Sainato, member of the Pennsylvania House of Representatives
 Ira D. Sankey (August 28, 1840 – August 13, 1908), gospel singer and composer
 Raymond P. Shafer (March 5, 1917 - December 12, 2006), 39th governor of Pennsylvania from 1967 to 1971
 Frank Shields (born 1945), former Oregon state senator
 John W. Slayton, prominent socialist and labor union leader
 Robert Sterling (November 13, 1917 – May 30, 2006), film and television actor who starred in many films including the 1951 MGM hit Show Boat
 Chuck Tanner (July 4, 1929 – February 11, 2011), former left fielder and manager in Major League Baseball, and skipper of the Pittsburgh Pirates' 1979 World Series champion team
 George Zambelli, Sr., Born in New Castle October 19, 1924 (d. December 25, 2003) was an American fireworks entertainer, and long-time president and manager of Zambelli Fireworks
 Jack Zduriencik, Seattle Mariners general manager, former Pittsburgh Pirates scout

References

External links

 
 Valley Town (1940), a documentary on unemployment during the Great Depression, filmed in New Castle
 

 
1802 establishments in Pennsylvania
Cities in Pennsylvania
Cities in Lawrence County, Pennsylvania
County seats in Pennsylvania
Pittsburgh metropolitan area
Populated places established in 1802